Loco Hills is a census-designated place and unincorporated community in Eddy County, New Mexico, United States. Its population was 126 as of the 2010 census. Loco Hills has a post office with ZIP code 88255. U.S. Route 82 passes through the community.

It is within the Artesia Public Schools school district. Artesia High School is the school district's sole comprehensive high school.

Demographics

References

Census-designated places in New Mexico
Census-designated places in Eddy County, New Mexico